

Notes

References

Bibliography 
Rapp, S. H. Jr. (2016) The Sasanian World Through Georgian Eyes, Caucasia and the Iranian Commonwealth in Late Antique Georgian Literature, Sam Houston State University, USA, Routledge, 
Rayfield, D. (2013) Edge of Empires: A History of Georgia, Reaktion Books, 
Settipani, C. (2006) Continuité des élites à Byzance durant les siècles obscurs. Les princes caucasiens et l'Empire du VIe au IXe siècle, Paris, 
Toumanoff, C. (1990) The dynasties of Christian Caucasus from Antiquity to the 19th century: Genealogical and chronological tables, Rome

Further reading 
The Georgian Chronicles, Life of the Georgian kings, royal annals
Conversion of Kartli (chronicle), The Chronicle, royal annals
Marie-Félicité Brosset, History of Georgia from Antiquity to the 19th century, Volume 1-7, Saint-Petersburg, 1848–58 

Georgian family trees
Descent from antiquity
Pharnavazid dynasty
Chosroid dynasty
Guaramid dynasty
Iberia